Kargoecius is a genus of mites in the family Acaridae.

Species
 Kargoecius longiseta (Karg, 1971)

References

Acaridae